Sinners is a lost 1920 American silent drama film based on a play of the same name by Owen Davis. The play was produced by William A. Brady and starred his daughter Alice Brady who also stars in this film. The Realart Company produced and released the film. Alice Brady's husband James Crane appears in this picture as well as in her next film, A Dark Lantern.

Plot
Based upon a review in a film publication, the plot contrasts the corrupt gay life of the city with the dignity and wholesome life of people in the country. When Mary Horton (Brady) goes to the city seeking work but fails to find it, she is befriended by Hilda Newton (Anderson), a woman of questionable reputation. The friends of this woman are the sinners of the film and when word of Mary's association with them reaches home, there are some false accusations made against Mary. After Mary returns to her home, her city friends come to visit, leading to some dramatic situations.

Cast
Alice Brady as Mary Horton
Agnes Everett as Mrs. Horton
Augusta Anderson as Hilda Newton
Lorraine Frost as Polly Gary
Nora Reed as Saidee
James Crane as Bob Merrick
William T. Carleton as Horace Worth
Frank Losee as William Morgan
Crauford Kent as Dr. Simpson
Robert Schable as Joe Garfield

References

External links

allmovie/synopsis; Sinners
 Lantern slide; coming attractions; Sinners

1920 films
American silent feature films
Lost American films
American films based on plays
Films directed by Kenneth Webb
American black-and-white films
Silent American drama films
1920 drama films
1920 lost films
Lost drama films
1920s American films